Jozić is a surname. It is a patronymic of Jozo.

It is one of the most common surnames in the Bjelovar-Bilogora County of Croatia.

Notable people with the surname include:

Davor Jozić (born 1960), Yugoslav footballer
Ivica Jozić (born 1969), Bosnian football player
Mario Jozić (born 1972), Croatian football goalkeeper
Mirko Jozić (born 1940), Croatian football coach
Nikola Jozić (born 1982), German-born Serbian football defender

References

Croatian surnames